Tomás Caldas Januário Carvalho Domingos (born 1 May 1999) is a Portuguese professional footballer who plays for C.D. Mafra as a defender

Football career
On 13 September 2020, Domingos made his professional debut with Mafra in a Liga Portugal 2 match against Cova da Piedade.

References

External links

1999 births
Living people
Portuguese footballers
Association football defenders
Liga Portugal 2 players
C.D. Mafra players
People from Oeiras, Portugal
Sportspeople from Lisbon District